Stabler Arena is a 6,200-seat multi-purpose arena in Bethlehem, Pennsylvania in the Lehigh Valley region of the state. Owned and operated by Lehigh University, it is located on the school's Goodman Campus. 

Stabler Arena is named for Donald B. Stabler, a 1930 Lehigh graduate, founder of Stabler Companies Inc., and a member of the university's Board of Trustees for over 30 years. He and his wife, Dorothy, were the primary donors for the facility. The arena officially opened with Lehigh's Commencement Exercises on May 29, 1979, replacing Taylor Gymnasium, which had hosted Lehigh athletics since 1914.  Its first public event was Holiday on Ice in November later that same year.

Athletics
Stabler Arena is home to the Lehigh University Mountain Hawks basketball teams, who play in the NCAA Division I Patriot League. Stabler was also home to two indoor football teams, the Lehigh Valley Outlawz and the Lehigh Valley Steelhawks and the Pennsylvania ValleyDawgs basketball team.

Stabler also has hosted ABC's Wide World of Sports and the U.S. Women's gymnastics finals.

Music
Because of the arena's reputation for exceptional acoustics and lively audiences, some musical acts have kicked off their U.S. concert tours at Stabler, including The Cranberries, Grateful Dead, Judas Priest, KISS, Bette Midler & The Moody Blues. 

Grateful Dead played at Stabler Arena on September 25, 1981. On November 9, 1993, Nirvana played at Stabler Arena in one of lead singer's Kurt Cobain's final performances prior to his April 5, 1994 suicide.

Pop/R&B icon Whitney Houston filmed the video for her 1987 single, So Emotional, here during her  Moment of Truth World Tour. The video was directed by Wayne Isham and the song would go on to be her sixth (of 7) #1 singles in a row on Billboard Hot 100 - a record still for Houston.

Renovations and upgrades 

A new LED scorer's table was added, along with two new competition baskets with three-sided shot clocks, and two fixed digit scoreboards were installed in time for the start of the 2016-17 basketball season. The arena also debuted a new baseline club, a court-level area behind one of the baskets that features high-top tables.
 In the summer of 2017, the arena received a new basketball floor.

See also
 List of NCAA Division I basketball arenas

References

External links
Official website.

Buildings and structures completed in 1979
Basketball venues in Pennsylvania
College basketball venues in the United States
Lehigh Mountain Hawks men's basketball
Music venues in Pennsylvania
Buildings and structures in Northampton County, Pennsylvania
Event venues established in 1979
1979 establishments in Pennsylvania
Indoor arenas in Pennsylvania